Woodhull Lake is a 135-acre all-sports lake located in central Oakland County, Michigan.  The lake has a maximum depth of 56 feet.  It is located in both Waterford Township and Independence Township.

Woodhull Lake is located on the upper reaches of the Clinton River watershed. The Clinton
River enters Woodhull Lake on the west end and exits on the north end.  Approximately three-quarters of a mile upstream is the dam for Van Norman Lake, the next lake upstream. The Clinton River between these two lakes is wide with slow flow. Also upstream is the 26-acre Townsend Lake.

Downstream from Woodhull Lake, it is connected to Lake Oakland. There is a dam on Lake Oakland and both Lake Oakland and Woodhull Lake have a legal established lake level elevation of 957.43.

On the southeast side of Woodhull Lake, there is a connection to Eagle
Lake, a small, 19-acre, 20-feet deep lake which flows into Woodhull Lake.

Namesake
Woodhull Lake was named for John Chatfield Hedges Woodhull (1804-1877) who, along with his wife Rachel Woodhull (1808-1872), owned much of the northern property in section 35 of Independence Township on the lake that would bear their family name.

Fish
Woodhull Lake fish included bluegill, pumpkinseed, northern pike, rock bass, black crappie, largemouth bass, brown bullhead, bowfin and carp.

References

Lakes of Oakland County, Michigan
Lakes of Michigan
Lakes of Waterford Township, Michigan
Lakes of Independence Township, Michigan